is a passenger railway station located in Tarumi-ku, Kobe, Hyōgo Prefecture, Japan, operated by the West Japan Railway Company (JR West).

Lines

Station layout
The station consists of two opposed side platforms connected by a footbridge. The station is staffed.

Platforms

Adjacent stations

|-
!colspan=5|JR West

History
Shioya Station opened on 1 July 1896 as a temporary stop, and was promoted to a full station on 1 December 1906. 

On 18 June 1967, a home-made bomb exploded on a commuter train here, killing two and wounding 29. The motive has never been discovered.

With the privatization of the Japan National Railways (JNR) on 1 April 1987, the station came under the aegis of the West Japan Railway Company.

Station numbering was introduced in March 2018 with Shioya being assigned station number JR-A69.

Passenger statistics
In fiscal 2019, the station was used by an average of 6640 passengers daily

Surrounding area
Sanyo Shioya Station (Sanyo Electric Railway Main Line)
Mount James 
Mt. Hachibuse
Shioya Wakamiya Shrine

See also
List of railway stations in Japan

References

External links

 JR West Station Official Site

Sanyō Main Line
Railway stations in Kobe
Railway stations in Japan opened in 1896